Vlees (Meat) is a 2010 Dutch erotic drama-thriller film directed by Victor Nieuwenhuijs and Maartje Seyferth.  It follows a young blonde woman working at a butcher shop and her relationships with a butcher who sexually harasses her (which she enjoys) and her boyfriend who is involved with a murder.  Vlees premiered at the 2010 International Film Festival Rotterdam.

References

External links

2010 films
2010s Dutch-language films
2010 thriller drama films
Dutch thriller drama films
Dutch erotic thriller films
2010s erotic thriller films
BDSM in films
2010s erotic drama films
2010 drama films